Arcanacon is a role-playing convention held in Melbourne annually. It is one of several Role-playing conventions of Victoria, Australia run through the year.

Arcanacon is the longest running role-playing convention in Victoria.

In 1983 the convention was held at Melbourne University. As well as a Dungeons and Dragons major, it also included the second ever freeform to be run in Australia, as well as Traveller, DragonQuest, RuneQuest and Call of Cthulhu tournaments.

1984 saw the convention at University High School and the major appearance of Syd the Arcanasaur, the convention's mascot. In 1985 the convention moved to Melbourne College of Advanced Education, in 1988 it moved to Collingwood Education Centre where it remained until 2013. In 2014 it moved to Melbourne High School, joining Conquest www.conquest.asn.au and Unicon www.unicon.asn.au at that venue.

Initially the convention was held in September, but it later moved to August and then to July, where it was run during the Victorian School holiday period. In 2001, the convention moved to the Australia Day Weekend (the weekend closest to 26 January). The move was in part due to a perceived change in the focus of CanCon (which is run in Canberra on the same weekend) from mixed roleplaying and wargaming to solely wargaming.

Although sections of the convention had been run with various theme over the years, at Arcanacon XII the convention itself started running an overall theme. In 2000 this theme became a part of the events run at the convention, and games in the theme were sought out to give each year a different feel.

In 2007, a short documentary about roleplaying was filmed at Arcanacan XXI for the Channel 31 television programme Planet Nerd.

List of conventions

1983 Arcanacon I
1984 Arcanacon II
1985 Arcanacon III
1986 Arcanacon IV
1987 Arcanacon V
1988 Arcanacon VI
1989 Arcanacon VII
1990 Arcanacon VIII
1991 Arcanacon IX
1992 Arcanacon X
1993 Arcanacon XI - First Eleven
1994 Arcanacon XII - The Dirty Dozen
1995 Arcanacon XIII - Unlucky for Some
1996 Arcanacon XIV
1997 Arcanacon XV
1998 Arcanacon XVI - Sweet Sixteen
1999 Arcanacon XVII - Summer of the 17th Troll
2000 Arcanacon XVIII - Arcanacon 1800s: A Victorian Roleplaying Convention
2001 Arcanacon XIX - Arcanacon 2001: a roleplaying convention
2002 Arcanacon XX - Akenaken: Secrets of the ancient world
2003 Arcanacon XXI - anniversaries, birthdays and celebrations

2004 Arcanacon XXII - Folk Tales and Faerie Stories
2005 Arcanacon XXIII - conspiracies, secrets and paranoia
2006 Arcanacon XXIV - Swashbuckling, Exploration and Adventure
2007 Arcanacon XXV - Legends of the Silver Screen
2008 Arcanacon XXVI - Zombies, and Witches, and Dragons, Oh My!
2009 Arcanacon XXVII - Syd-Punk
2010 Arcanacon XXVIII - For Science!
2011 Arcanacon XXIX
2012 Arcanacon XXX - End of the World
2013 Arcanacon XXXI - After the Apocalypse
2014 Arcanacon XXXII - Rebirth
2015 Arcanacon XXXIII - Back to the Future
2019 Arcanacon XXXIV

See also

 The Sunday Age (Australia), Gang Game Nazi-like, racist - police. 386 words, 31 May 1992, p. 5
 Sydney Morning Herald (Australia), Space Oddities. By Michael Idato, 1815 words 3 June 2000, Computers Section p. 10.
 The Age (Australia), Role-playing Nerdy? Nah!. By Carolyn Webb, 1058 words, 25 January 2001, Today Section p. 3.
 Ariel Archives CD, published by Brett Easterbrook (Ariel Archives website)

External links
 http://arcanacon.org/

Role-playing conventions
Conventions in Australia
1983 establishments in Australia
Recurring events established in 1983
Annual events in Australia
Events in Melbourne
Winter events in Australia